Marcos Javier Yáñez Fernández (born 10 April 1977), known as Changui, is a Spanish former footballer who played as a striker.

He spent most of his career with Galician teams, appearing with Compostela and Deportivo de La Coruña in La Liga.

Club career
Born in Boiro, A Coruña, Changui's beginnings as a professional were with SD Compostela, appearing in La Liga during the 1997–98 season by playing six matches and scoring one goal, against Racing de Santander in a 1–1 away draw. He went on to represent several Segunda División teams before being purchased by Deportivo de La Coruña in 2000, although he would play almost no part during his tenure (two league appearances in 2004–05, 13 minutes played), also serving a loan to UD Las Palmas.

Changui was again loaned in August 2005, this time to Greek side Skoda Xanthi FC. Months later, he came back to Spain without his parent club's permission, facing the subsequent and pertinent disciplinary proceedings; the player was summoned by Deportivo on 8 March 2006 but did not appear, sending instead his agent, who stated that he did not know about the player's departure from Xanthi until the Spaniards took action.

Finally, Deportivo cancelled Changui's contract on 9 June 2006. The latter reacted demanding the former for unpaid wages, after having signed for CF Extremadura.

After being released by Extremadura, Changui joined SD Ciudad de Santiago of the Tercera División. He helped them to achieve promotion to Segunda División B in the 2007–08 campaign and, in 2009, resumed his career in the amateur leagues in his native region.

Changui became president of fourth-tier CD Boiro in 2018. At the same time, he was the team's top scorer and also worked as a security guard.

Personal life
In October 2016, the 39-year-old Changui was placed in an induced coma after being admitted to the Conxo Hospital in Santiago de Compostela with an extremely high temperature. He eventually recovered fully after being diagnosed with sepsis, and returned to playing football with his team Ribadumia CF.

References

External links

Deportivo archives

1977 births
Living people
People from O Barbanza
Sportspeople from the Province of A Coruña
Spanish footballers
Footballers from Galicia (Spain)
Association football forwards
La Liga players
Segunda División players
Segunda División B players
Tercera División players
Divisiones Regionales de Fútbol players
SD Compostela footballers
Pontevedra CF footballers
Deportivo de La Coruña players
Elche CF players
Polideportivo Ejido footballers
UD Las Palmas players
CF Extremadura footballers
CD Boiro footballers
Super League Greece players
Xanthi F.C. players
Spanish expatriate footballers
Expatriate footballers in Greece
Spanish expatriate sportspeople in Greece